Camus is a Basque surname, stage name, and given name. Notable people named Camus include:

Given name
Camus Celli, U.S. songwriter, record producer, and entrepreneur

Stage name
Camus (musician) (a.k.a. Dave Sale), U.S. singer and songwriter

Surname
Aimée Antoinette Camus (1879–1965), French botanist; daughter of Edmond Gustave Camus
Albert Camus (1913–1960), a French Nobel Prize-winning author, philosopher, and journalist, often referred to simply as "Camus"
Armand-Gaston Camus (1740–1804), French Revolutionary leader
Blanche-Augustine Camus (1884–1968), French painter; daughter of Edmond Gustave Camus
Charles Étienne Louis Camus (1699–1768), French mathematician and mechanician
Chico Camus (born 1985), U.S. bantamweight mixed martial artist
Edmond Gustave Camus (1852–1915), French pharmacist and botanist; father of Aimée Antoinette Camus and Blanche-Augustine Camus
Elisabeth Camus, French racing cyclist
Émile Le Camus (1839–1906), French Catholic bishop, theologian, and scripturist
Étienne Le Camus (1632–1707), French cardinal
Fabien Camus (born 1985), Tunisian footballer
François Joseph des Camus (1672–1732), French mechanic
Giulio Camus (1847–1917), French botanist and entomologist
Jean-Pierre Camus de Pontcarré (1584–1652), French bishop and writer
Jules-Alexandre Duval Le Camus (1817–1878), French historical and scriptural painter; son of Pierre Duval Le Camus
Jean-Yves Camus (born 1958), French political scientist
Louis-Camus Destouches (1668–1726), French artillery officer
Manuel Camus (1875–1949), Philippine lawyer and politician
Marcel Camus (1912–1982), French film director and Golden Palm winner
Mario Camus (1935–2021), Spanish screenwriter and film director
Matilde Camus (1919–2012), Spanish poet, author, and researcher
Nicolas Le Camus de Mézières (1721–1789), French architect and theoretician
Philippe Camus (businessman) (born 1948), French businessman
Philippe Camus (writer) ( 15th-century), French writer and historian
Pierre Duval Le Camus (1790–1854), French genre and portrait painter; father of Jules-Alexandre Duval Le Camus
Renato Camus (1891–1971), Italian architect
Renaud Camus (born 1946), French writer
Sébastien Le Camus ( 1610–1677), French composer
Thane Camus (born 1970), U.S. expatriate television personality and actor in Japan

Basque-language surnames
Surnames of French origin